The Palestinian ambassador in Beijing is the official representative of the Palestinian government to the Government of China.

List of representatives

People's Republic of China Ambassador to the Palestinian National Authority

References 

China
Palestine